A wind advisory is generally issued by the National Weather Service of the United States when there are sustained thunderstorm winds of  and/or gusts of  over land.  Winds over the said cap will trigger high wind alerts rather than a wind advisory. The advisory is site specific, but winds of this magnitude occurring over an area that frequently experiences such wind speeds on a basis will not trigger a wind advisory. A slightly lower wind speed in areas around lakes may trigger a Lake wind advisory instead.

Example
The following is an example of a Wind Advisory issued by the National Weather Service Office in Norman, Oklahoma on Sunday November 25, 2018.

URGENT - WEATHER MESSAGE...UPDATED
National Weather Service Norman OK
1147 AM CST Sun Nov 25 2018

OKZ004>024-033>038-TXZ083>085-087-088-252100-
/O.CON.KOUN.WI.Y.0019.000000T0000Z-181125T2100Z/
Harper-Woods-Alfalfa-Grant-Kay-Ellis-Woodward-Major-Garfield-
Noble-Roger Mills-Dewey-Custer-Blaine-Kingfisher-Logan-Payne-
Beckham-Washita-Caddo-Canadian-Harmon-Greer-Kiowa-Jackson-Tillman-
Comanche-Hardeman-Foard-Wilbarger-Knox-Baylor-
Including the cities of Buffalo, Laverne, Alva, Cherokee, Helena,
Carmen, Medford, Pond Creek, Lamont, Wakita, Ponca City,
Blackwell, Shattuck, Arnett, Gage, Fargo, Woodward, Fairview,
Enid, Perry, Cheyenne, Hammon, Seiling, Vici, Taloga, Leedey,
Weatherford, Clinton, Watonga, Geary, Okeene, Kingfisher,
Hennessey, Okarche, Guthrie, Stillwater, Elk City, Sayre,
Cordell, Burns Flat, Sentinel, Anadarko, Hinton, Yukon, Concho,
El Reno, Mustang, Hollis, Mangum, Granite, Hobart, Snyder, Altus,
Frederick, Lawton, Quanah, Crowell, Vernon, Munday, Knox City,
and Seymour
1147 AM CST Sun Nov 25 2018

...WIND ADVISORY REMAINS IN EFFECT UNTIL 3 PM CST THIS
AFTERNOON...

* WINDS...Northwest 25 to 35 mph with gusts up to 50 mph.

* TIMING...Until mid-afternoon Sunday.

* IMPACTS...Strong winds can cause unsecured items to be blown
  into other structures or people. Driving may be difficult in
  some areas.

PRECAUTIONARY/PREPAREDNESS ACTIONS...

A Wind Advisory means that winds of 35 mph with higher gusts are
expected. Winds this strong can make driving difficult, especially
for high profile vehicles. Use extra caution.

&&

$$

See also
Gale warning
Hurricane force wind warning
Lake wind advisory
Small craft advisory
Storm warning

References

Weather warnings and advisories